Hics or HICS may refer to:
Hospital incident command system, emergency response and preparedness system for hospitals in the United States
Holt International Children's Services, adoption agency based in Eugene, Oregon, United States
Hawaii Inter-Island Cable System, fiber optic telecommunication cable system
The Hics, English electronic band formed in London in 2012

See also
Hic (disambiguation)